Ivanka Moralieva (born 15 October 1983) is a Bulgarian former swimmer, who specialized in long-distance freestyle events and open water marathon. Since 2001, she holds a Bulgarian record in the 1500 m freestyle from the World Championships in Fukuoka, Japan (16:55.53). She also won a bronze medal in the 25 km, as an open water swimmer, at the 2004 European Aquatics Championships in Madrid, Spain (4:41:21.2).

Moralieva made her first Bulgarian team, as a 17-year-old, at the 2000 Summer Olympics in Sydney. There, she failed to advance to the succeeding round in any of her individual events, finishing thirty-fourth in the 200 m freestyle (2:07.61), thirtieth in the 400 m freestyle (4:19.10), and twentieth in the 800 m freestyle (8:52.61).

At the 2004 Summer Olympics in Athens, Moralieva qualified only for two swimming events with five days in between. She posted FINA B-standard entry times of 4:22.41 (400 m freestyle) and 8:55.15 (800 m freestyle) from the European Championships. On the second day of the Games, Moralieva placed thirty-sixth overall in the 400 m freestyle. Swimming in heat one, she 
saved a fifth spot over Croatia's Anita Galić, who finished behind her in last place by 0.17 of a second, with a time of 4:25.92. In her second event, 800 m freestyle, Moralieva challenged seven other swimmers on the second heat, including Germany's Jana Henke, who won a bronze in Barcelona twelve years before (1992). She rounded out a field to last place by a 5.17-second margin behind Ukraine's Olga Beresnyeva in 9:03.13. Moralieva failed to reach the top 8 final, as she placed twenty-sixth overall from the morning's preliminaries.

References

1983 births
Living people
Bulgarian female swimmers
Olympic swimmers of Bulgaria
Swimmers at the 2000 Summer Olympics
Swimmers at the 2004 Summer Olympics
Bulgarian female freestyle swimmers
Female long-distance swimmers
People from Smolyan
European Aquatics Championships medalists in swimming
20th-century Bulgarian women
21st-century Bulgarian women